Malladi Ramakrishna Sastry M.A. (16 June 1905 – 12 September 1965) was a Telugu writer.

Lifesketch
Their family has settled in Bandar (Machilipatnam) during his childhood. 
He has passed B.A. in Machilipatnam and M.A. in Telugu and Sanskrit in Madras. 
He learnt Vedas from Yadavalli Subbavadhanulu, Mahabhashyam 
from Nori Subramanya Sastry and Brahmasutras from Sistla Narasimha Sastry. 
He is highly learned and said to be known about 50 different languages.

Literary works
 Chalava Miriyalu (compilation of his works)
 Krishnateeram
 Tejomurthulu
 Kshetrayya
 Gopidevi
 Keligopalam
 Baala
 Aa Ee Vu R
 Safety Razor

Filmography
Malladi wrote about 150 songs for nearly 40 films.

Death
He died of Cerebral hemorrhage due to Hypertension on 12 September 1965 in Chennai.

References

External links
 

Telugu people
1905 births
1965 deaths
Telugu-language lyricists